Melvin Kolf (born 22 March 1986 in Nijmegen) is a Dutch footballer who played for Eerste Divisie club TOP Oss during the 2009-2010 football season.

References

Dutch footballers
Footballers from Nijmegen
TOP Oss players
Eerste Divisie players
1986 births
Living people

Association footballers not categorized by position
21st-century Dutch people